Lee John Thomas Starck, better known by his stage name Leeroy Stagger, is a Canadian alternative country singer-songwriter based in Lethbridge, Alberta. He has released a number of albums of his own music, produced albums for several other musicians, and has toured around North America.

Early life

Stagger was born in Victoria, British Columbia and grew up in rural British Columbia.

Career
Stagger performed in several local British Columbia bands, including the Graveyard Sluts and the Staggers. In 2002 he accompanied Hot Hot Heat and Carolyn Mark on a Canadian tour. Reinventing himself as a singer-songwriter, he released his debut independent EP, Six Tales of Danger, in 2002. He now is based in Lethbridge, Alberta.

Stagger has gone on tour as a supporting act for The Pixies, Modest Mouse and Evan Dando, and has collaborated with Danny Michel.

In 2015 Stagger won the top prize at the Alberta Peak Performance Project competition, and used the money to develop a home studio in Lethbridge. He produced a 2017 album, Sleeping Buffalo, for The Wardens.

Leeroy Stagger's 11th studio recording, Love Versus, was released 7 April 2017, through True North. The album was produced by Colin Stewart (Dan Mangan, Black Mountain, Yukon Blonde), and includes performances from drummer Pete Thomas (Elvis Costello), guitarist Paul Rigby (Neko Case), keyboardist Geoff Hilhorst (the Deep Dark Woods), and Stagger's longtime bassist Tyson Maiko.

The first single from Love Versus, was "I Want It All" , a meditation on being grateful for what one has. Stagger continued touring and performing songs from this album in 2018.

In 2019 Stagger released the album Strange Path, which included a song acknowledging the influence of Gord Downie. He headed out on a North American tour in support of the album.

Discography

Albums 

 Dear Love (2004)
 Beautiful House (2005)
 Depression River (2006)
 Everything Is Real (2009)
 Little Victories (2010)
 Radiant Land (2012)
 Truth be Sold (2013)
 Dream It All Away (2015)
 Love Versus (2017)
 Me and the Mountain (2019)
 Strange Path (2019)

EPs 

 Six Tales of Danger (2002)
 Tales from the Back Porch (2006)

Live 

 Live at the Red River Saloon (2010)

See also

Canadian rock
List of Canadian musicians
Music of Canada

References

External links
Leeroy Stagger official site
Profile of Leeroy Stagger in HARP Magazine

Year of birth missing (living people)
Living people
Canadian alternative country singers
Canadian rock singers
Canadian male singer-songwriters
Canadian country singer-songwriters
Musicians from Victoria, British Columbia
Canadian Folk Music Award winners